Allium oporinanthum  is a European species of wild onion native to Spain and France.

References

Garlic
oporinanthum
Flora of Spain
Flora of France
Plants described in 1997